United People for Social Renovation (PURS) is a political party in Cameroon.

History
The party was founded by Serge Espoir Matomba and others in 2010, but did not nominate a candidate for the 2011 presidential elections. It did contest the 2013 parliamentary elections as "United People for Social Revolution", but failed to win a seat. Serge Espoir Matomba served as the party's candidate for the 2018 presidential elections.

In 2021, Matomba condemned an ambush of Rapid Intervention Battalion troops by Anglophone separatists as "shameful attack on Cameroon's democracy".

Ideology 
The party runs on a platform of anti-corruption and governmental reform, although these are common for Cameroonian parties opposed to Paul Biya's government. In addition, PURS is strongly committed to social issues, with the party's leaders organizing a hunger strike in 2013 to protest against the Biya government's decision to raise the prices of hydrocarbon fuels. In addition, PURS wants to improve conditions for businesses in the private sector, proposing to reduce the corporate tax from 30% to 10% as well as exempting small startup companies from certain taxes. The party opposes the implementation of a minimum wage, believing it would stifle Cameroonian companies; PURS wants to first encourage the growth of businesses so that more unemployed people can get jobs before implementing better salaries.

References

Political parties in Cameroon
2010 establishments in Cameroon
Political parties established in 2010